El Senbellawein is a city in the Dakahlia Governorate of Egypt.

Famous residents include political activist Ahmed Lutfi el-Sayed, singer Umm Kulthum, actress Faten Hamama, first female general director of Egyptian TV Tomader Tawfik, footballer Mahmoud El Khatib and geologist Farouk El-Baz.

Etymology 
The origin of the city's name in unknown. The ancient town Psembelle is attested in the same nome, but it's unclear if the two are related.

Projects
In 2018 the Egyptian Government began infrastructure projects in El Senbellawein.

Climate

Köppen-Geiger climate classification system classifies its climate as hot desert (BWh), as the rest of Egypt.

Economy
Sinbellawein's economy is based on agriculture and services sectors, which it offers for many of the surrounding 282 villages that are under its administration. Car repairing and car tanks production also play a large role in the economy. Al Aseil Pasta& flour factory is producing most of the city needs. There is also Mag factory for making pipes.

Transport
Auto rickshaw (tuk tuk) is a motor vehicle that is one of the chief modes of transport across El Senbellawein and small villages around it. There are also a station in the centre of the city which helps travellers to cities such as Cairo, Mansoura, Zagazig, and Mahalla.
The station is also composed of 2 varieties:
1- Bus station which works only from 6:00 am till 4:00 pm
2- Micro-bus which nearly work till 1:00 am

See also
 List of cities and towns in Egypt

References

External links
 Dakahlia Governorate Official Website

Populated places in Dakahlia Governorate
Cities in Egypt
Medieval cities of Egypt
Metropolitan areas of Egypt
Governorate capitals in Egypt